The Samsung Galaxy S23 is a series of high-end Android-based smartphones designed, developed, manufactured, and marketed by Samsung Electronics as part of its flagship Galaxy S series. The phones were announced on 1 February 2023 at Galaxy Unpacked and was released on 17 February 2023. They collectively serve as the successor to the Samsung Galaxy S22 series.

History 
Samsung Galaxy S23, S23+, and S23 Ultra were announced on 1 February 2023 at Galaxy Unpacked.

Lineup 
The Galaxy S23 series includes three devices, which share the same lineup and screen sizes with the previous Galaxy S22 series. The entry-level Galaxy S23 features a flat 6.1-inch (155 mm) display with a variable refresh rate from 48 Hz to 120 Hz, 8 GB of RAM, and storage options from 128 GB to 512 GB. The Galaxy S23+ features similar hardware in a larger 6.6-inch (168 mm) form factor, storage options starting at 256 GB, faster charging rate and larger battery capacity. At the top of the lineup, the Galaxy S23 Ultra features a curved 6.8-inch (173 mm) display with a variable refresh rate starting at 1 Hz, 8 GB or 12 GB of RAM, storage options from 256 GB to 1 TB, and the largest battery capacity in the lineup. Additionally, it features a more advanced camera setup, a higher-resolution display, and like the previous Galaxy S22 Ultra, an integrated S Pen for increased functionality and productivity.

Design 

All models in the Samsung Galaxy S23 series are available in four standard colors: Phantom Black, Cream, Green, and Lavender, with four additional colors available only at samsung.com: Graphite, Lime, and the Galaxy S23 Ultra exclusives Sky Blue and Red.

Specifications

Hardware

Chipset 
Samsung Galaxy S23, S23+, and S23 Ultra use Qualcomm Snapdragon 8 Gen 2 for Galaxy chip. The Qualcomm Snapdragon 8 Gen 2 for Galaxy includes an Octa-Core CPU and an Adreno 740 GPU with a Qualcomm X70 modem for connectivity. The Qualcomm Snapdragon 8 Gen 2 for Galaxy is a special version of the Snapdragon 8 Gen 2 developed specifically for Samsung. The difference between the regular version of the Snapdragon compared to the Samsung version is that the Samsung version features an overclocked Cortex-X3 core at 3.36 GHz instead of 3.20 GHz, and the Adreno 740 GPU has been overclocked to 719 MHz instead of 680 MHz.

Display 
The Galaxy S23 series features a "Dynamic AMOLED 2X" display with HDR10+ support, 1750 nits of peak brightness, and "dynamic tone mapping" technology. All models use an ultrasonic in-screen fingerprint sensor.

Cameras 

The Galaxy S23 and S23+ have a 50 MP wide sensor, a 10 MP telephoto sensor and a 12 MP ultrawide sensor. The S23 Ultra has a 200 MP wide sensor, two 10 MP telephoto sensors and a 12 MP ultrawide sensor. The front camera uses a 12 MP sensor on all three models.

Connectivity 
Samsung Galaxy S23, S23+, and S23 Ultra support 5G SA/NSA/Sub6, Wi-Fi 6E, and Bluetooth 5.3 connectivity.

Memory and storage 

The Samsung Galaxy S23 offers 8 GB of RAM and 128 GB, 256 GB, and in some regions, 512 GB of internal storage options. The Galaxy S23+ offers 8 GB of RAM and 256 GB and 512 GB of internal storage options. The Galaxy S23 Ultra has 8 GB or 12 GB of RAM and 256 GB, 512 GB, and 1 TB of internal storage options. In some regions, the 12 GB RAM option of the S23 Ultra is only available starting with 512 GB of internal storage.

The 128 GB version of the Galaxy S23 uses the older UFS 3.1 storage format, while versions with 256 GB and more use the newer, faster and more efficient UFS 4.0.

Batteries 
The Galaxy S23, S23+, and S23 Ultra contain non-removable 3,900 mAh, 4,700 mAh, and 5000 mAh Li-ion batteries respectively. The S23 supports wired charging over USB-C at up to 25W (using USB Power Delivery) while the S23+ and S23 Ultra have faster 45W charging. All three have Qi inductive charging up to 15W. The phones also have the ability to charge other Qi-compatible devices from the S23's own battery power, which is branded as "Wireless PowerShare," at up to 4.5W.

Software 
The Samsung Galaxy S23 phones were released with Android 13 with Samsung's One UI 5.1 software. Samsung Knox is included for enhanced device security, and a separate version exists for enterprise use. Samsung has promised 4 years of major Android OS updates and 1 additional year of security updates for a total of 5 years worth of updates.

Controversies 
On March 10, a redit user named ibreakphotos accused Samsung of faking moon picture by adding AI generated image of the moon on the existing photos.

Gallery

References

External links 
 Samsung Galaxy S23 & S23+ – Official website
 Samsung Galaxy S23 Ultra – Official website

Android (operating system) devices
Samsung Galaxy
Flagship smartphones
Samsung smartphones
Mobile phones with multiple rear cameras
Mobile phones with 8K video recording
Mobile phones introduced in 2023